USS Kerlew (ID-1325) was a United States Navy cargo ship in commission from 1918 to 1919.

Kerlew was built in 1906 at Stockton-on-Tees, England, by Craig, Taylor and Company, Ltd. Prior to World War I, she served as the Austro-Hungarian commercial cargo ship Virginia. She was named Kerlew and owned by Kerr Navigation Corporation of New York City by the time the United States Army acquired her on a bareboat charter basis in October 1917.

The U.S. Navy acquired Kerlew on 13 November 1918, two days after the end of World War I, at Cardiff, Wales, assigned her the naval registry Identification Number (Id. No.) 1325, and commissioned her the same day as USS Kerlew.

Assigned to the U.S. Army coal trade at Cardiff, Kerlew transported coal across the English Channel from British to French ports. She continued this duty until 29 January 1919, when she arrived at Invergordon, Scotland, to load a cargo of American naval mines for return to the United States. Departing Invergordon on 19 February 1919, she arrived in the United States at Norfolk, Virginia, on 9 March 1919.

Kerlew was decommissioned on 12 April 1919 and transferred the same day to the United States Shipping Board for simultaneous return to her owner.

Kerlew returned to commercial service.  She was renamed Mount Sidney in 1922 while serving as a merchant ship.

Notes

References

Department of the Navy: Naval Historical Center Online Library of Selected Images:  U.S. Navy Ships: USS Kerlew (ID # 1325), 1918-1919
NavSource Online: Section Patrol Craft Photo Archive: Kerlew (ID 1325)

Ships built on the River Tees
1905 ships
Cargo ships of the United States Navy
World War I cargo ships of the United States